Tommy Sheppard (born 6 March 1959) is a Scottish National Party (SNP) politician who has been the Member of Parliament (MP) for Edinburgh East since May 2015. He is a former SNP spokesperson for the Cabinet Office and a former SNP Shadow Leader of the House of Commons. He is also known for founding The Stand Comedy Clubs in Edinburgh and Glasgow.

Early life and education
Sheppard was born in Coleraine, County Londonderry, Northern Ireland, in 1959 and moved to nearby Portstewart at the age of seven. He was educated at Coleraine Academical Institution before attending the University of Aberdeen to study medicine. He graduated with a degree in politics and sociology in 1982. That same year he was elected Vice-President of the NUS and moved to London.

Political career
He left the NUS in 1984 to work in the East End of London and in 1986 was elected as a Labour member, on Hackney London Borough Council. In 1990 he became Deputy Leader of the council. Sheppard unsuccessfully contested Bury St Edmunds at the 1992 United Kingdom general election for the Labour Party, polling 14,767 votes and 23.6% of the vote. He moved back to Scotland and settled in Edinburgh, taking up a position with the District Council. In 1994 he was appointed Assistant General Secretary of Scottish Labour under John Smith. In 1997 he was made redundant from this role due to internal policy disagreements. He ceased to renew his Labour Party membership in 2003, stating: "I joined the Labour Party in 1979, just before my 21st birthday. Now 25 years later I've finally got around to cancelling the direct debit. I can no longer bring myself to vote Labour. My outlook has barely changed, but clearly the Labour Party has. I can no longer believe the Labour Party is likely to change the world very much, or at least not in a direction I would like".

In 2012 he became the Edinburgh South organiser of the Yes Scotland campaign, but joined the SNP only in 2014 after the 2014 Scottish independence referendum. He was selected as candidate for the Edinburgh East constituency and polled 23,188 and 49.2% of the vote, securing election with a majority of 9,106 and defeating incumbent Labour MP Sheila Gilmore. In October 2015 Tommy was elected to the SNP's National Executive Committee.  In March 2016 the Parliamentary Standards Committee announced that Mr Sheppard was under investigation for non-declaratory incomes.  Last year his own company Salt n' Sauce Promotions Limited shareholder Funds had proven greater than Sheppard had claimed.  He was reprimanded in the press by chairman Lord Bew, who called on reforms to be made to the scrutiny process of MPs earnings.  At present such reported errors could be dismissed as merely "administrative" omissions.  The details included thresholds governing how much ownership and share of control over companies must be over 15%.

Sheppard is a staunch republican, and during the wedding of Prince William and Kate Middleton, he remarked "off with their heads", prompting some criticism. Writing ahead of Prince Harry and Meghan Markle's wedding in 2018, Sheppard said, "There are many things to be proud of in Britain, but the class system and the inequality it spawns is not one of them. The monarchy sits at the apex of that system of patronage and privilege."

Sheppard is an atheist and a humanist, and was elected Vice Chair of the All-Party Parliamentary Humanist Group in 2017.

He held his Edinburgh East seat in the 2017 United Kingdom general election, albeit with a slightly reduced majority. During the election, he urged the Scottish Greens to step down from contesting marginal seats where the pro-independence vote might be split.

Following the 2017 election, which he described as a "major wake-up call" for the SNP, Sheppard encouraged First Minister Nicola Sturgeon to abandon plans for a second Scottish independence referendum before Brexit. He suggested the cause of Scottish independence would be served best if Sturgeon offered Scotland a vote on a future relationship with the European Union after Brexit and only once Scotland had become independent. In November 2017 he claimed that Scotland still had a mandate for a second independence referendum and that the Conservatives were wrong to think that the loss in SNP seats in the snap general election had caused a delay in the timetable for a second vote.

He has expressed admiration for the 18th century Scottish reformer and radical Thomas Muir, linking Muir's politics and life to the modern Scottish independence movement.

In 2018, he was widely considered one of the possible contenders for the 2018 Scottish National Party depute leadership election after having stood in the previous 2016 depute leadership election, but ruled himself out.

In July 2018, reflecting on the decision of SNP MPs to vote no confidence in the Labour Government in 1979, Sheppard told the House of Commons, "In retrospect, I would have done exactly the same thing.”

Comedy
Sheppard is a co-founder and former manager and promoter of The Stand Comedy Clubs in Edinburgh, Glasgow and Newcastle.

Personal life
In 2016, he told John Pienaar on BBC Radio 5 Live that he had taken amphetamines and cannabis when he was younger.

Sheppard is a humanist, and in 2022 was elected chair of the All-Party Parliamentary Humanist Group, whose secretariat is provided by Humanists UK.  He is also an honorary associate of the National Secular Society

References

External links
 Profile on SNP website

1959 births
Alumni of the University of Aberdeen
British republicans
Councillors in the London Borough of Hackney
Labour Party (UK) councillors
Living people
People educated at Coleraine Academical Institution
People from Coleraine, County Londonderry
Politicians from Northern Ireland
Scottish Labour politicians
Scottish National Party MPs
British humanists
Atheists from Northern Ireland
UK MPs 2015–2017
UK MPs 2017–2019
UK MPs 2019–present